Tongatapu 9 is an electoral constituency for the Legislative Assembly in the Kingdom of Tonga. It was established for the November 2010 general election, when the multi-seat regional constituencies for People's Representatives were replaced by single-seat constituencies, electing one representative via the first past the post electoral system. It is a rural constituency located in the south-east of the island of Tongatapu, and covers the villages of Tatakamotonga, Holonga, ʻAlakifonua, Pelehake, Toloa, Fuaʻamotu, Nakolo, Haʻasini, Hamula, Lavengatonga, Fatumu and Haveluliku.

Its first ever representative was Kaveinga Faʻanunu, a first term MP from the Democratic Party of the Friendly Islands, who won it in the November 2010 general election, and died of cancer seven months later, in July 2011. A by-election was held on September 15, 2011 - the first for any seat since the 2010 general election. The Democratic Party retained the seat, with its candidate Falisi Tupou winning by a substantial margin. It appears, at present, to be a safe seat for the party.

Members of Parliament

Election results

2010

2011 by-election

2014
Along with five other incumbent DPFI MPs, Falisi Tupou was not selected as a DPFI candidate for this election, and announced he would be running as an independent candidate.

References

Tongan legislative constituencies
Tongatapu
2010 establishments in Tonga
Constituencies established in 2010